Ethmia hieroglyphica is a moth in the family Depressariidae. It is found in Bolivia.

The ground color of the forewings is white, with black markings. The ground color of the hindwings is subhyaline (partially glassy) white, becoming pale brownish in the apical area.

References

Moths described in 1973
hieroglyphica